Escape from Hell is a fantasy novel by American writers Larry Niven and Jerry Pournelle. It is a sequel to Inferno, the 1976 book by the same authors.  It was released on February 17, 2009.

The novel continues the story of deceased science fiction writer Allen Carpenter (who spelled his name "Carpentier" on his novels) in his quest to help other damned souls in Hell. Like the first book, “Escape from Hell” extensively references Dante's Inferno. Jerry Pournelle, one of the book's co-authors, described the book as "Dante meets Vatican II."

Plot

Following events in the first novel, in which Carpenter learned that it is possible to leave Hell, Carpenter wants to help others in the way his benefactor helped him.  Carpenter meets and travels through all the circles of the Hell described by Dante. He is accompanied in his travels by Sylvia Plath (whom he rescues from the Wood of the Suicides by burning her tree, causing her physical body to reform itself), attempting to understand the purpose of Hell and free many of the damned. Carpenter discovers that, apparently because he returned to Hell of his own free will to help others, he now possesses powers and abilities such as his mentor, Benito, also displayed.

In his travels, Carpenter meets many well-known individuals deceased as of 2009. In addition to Plath, some of the notables encountered by Carpenter include:

 Lester del Rey
 Anna Nicole Smith
 Else Frenkel-Brunswik
 George Lincoln Rockwell
 Ted Hughes
 Charles Francis Adams, Sr.
 Albert Camus
 Carl Sagan
 Seung-Hui Cho
 Kenneth Lay
 Aimee Semple McPherson
 Peter Lawford
 J. Edgar Hoover
 Melvin Belli
 Reinhard Heydrich
 Frederick Lindemann, 1st Viscount Cherwell
 Sir Arthur Harris, 1st Baronet
 Jesse M. Unruh
 Leon Trotsky
 Pontius Pilate
 J. Robert Oppenheimer
 Frank Harris

In the end, and partly as the consequence of some unusual changes to Hell itself, Carpenter not so much escapes as that he is shown the door for being a troublemaker.

Critical reception
Published reviews were mixed. At the SF Site, Ivy Reisner found it "thoughtful", noting that it "runs far closer in tone to [Dante's] original" than does the 1976 book, and observing that it is a "charged political work" in which "not all of the condemnations will appeal to all of the readers" (in particular citing a teenage boy who was damned for sodomy because he had been raped by a priest). Publishers Weekly called it a "well-constructed tale" — albeit one whose "landscape and (...) plot are a little too familiar." James Nicoll described it as "an unnecessary sequel" which demonstrates "that a sequel to a successful book may not be very good".

References 

2009 American novels
Works based on Inferno (Dante)
Bangsian fantasy
Collaborative novels
Novels by Jerry Pournelle
Novels by Larry Niven
2009 science fiction novels
Sylvia Plath
Cultural depictions of J. Edgar Hoover
Cultural depictions of Anna Nicole Smith
Cultural depictions of Leon Trotsky
Ted Hughes
Tor Books books
J. Robert Oppenheimer